Ellawala Medhananda Thero (එල්ලාවල මේධානන්ද) is a Sri Lankan politician and a former member of the Parliament of Sri Lanka. He had also organized many charities and engaged himself in educational activities in under-prevailed rural communities. As an academic scholar (see Pieris, op. cit.) he has published 40 books of academic and archaeological research of which the book on the "Sinhala-Buddhist Heritage in the Northern and Eastern Provinces" published in 2003 by Jayakody Publishers in Colombo is most well known Medhananda was a parliamentarian elected by the Jathika hela Urumaya, a party which campaigned for the rights of Buddhists. As a consequence, many Marxist as well as minority Tamil writers have criticized him for his alleged right-wing political leanings and pro-majoritarian sentiments. He presented himself for elections twice first in 2004 then in 2010. Since then he has devoted himself to charitable works, teaching and scholarly activities in rural regions of Sri Lanka

References
 

Living people
Members of the 13th Parliament of Sri Lanka
Members of the 14th Parliament of Sri Lanka
Jathika Hela Urumaya politicians
United People's Freedom Alliance politicians
1937 births
Sinhalese archaeologists
Sri Lankan Buddhist monks